Waynesburg is an unincorporated community in southern Kentucky. Waynesburg has a post office with ZIP code 40489.

Climate
The climate in this area is characterized by hot, humid summers and generally mild to cool winters.  According to the Köppen Climate Classification system, Waynesburg has a humid subtropical climate, abbreviated "Cfa" on climate maps.

References

Unincorporated communities in Lincoln County, Kentucky
Unincorporated communities in Kentucky